McWhorter House was a historic home located near Odessa, New Castle County, Delaware.  It was built before 1810, and consisted of a two-story, three bay, frame main block with Italianate detailing with a two-story, frame kitchen wing to the rear. Also on the property were an early 20th-century frame privy, a late 19th-century board-and-batten storage shed, hewn frame carriage barn with crossgable over the entry, a -story timber framed crib barn and granary, and an early 19th-century dairy barn.

It was listed on the National Register of Historic Places in 1985. It was demolished in 2004.

References

Houses on the National Register of Historic Places in Delaware
Italianate architecture in Delaware
Houses completed in 1810
Houses in New Castle County, Delaware
National Register of Historic Places in New Castle County, Delaware